Al Qanab (also Romanized as Al Qanāb) is a village in Ojarud-e Markazi Rural District, in the Central District of Germi County, Ardabil Province, Iran. At the 2006 census, its population was 121, in 27 families.

References 

Towns and villages in Germi County